The 1999 FA Women's Cup Final was the 28th final of the FA Women's Cup, England's primary cup competition for women's football teams. It was the sixth final to be held under the direct control of the Football Association (FA).

Match

Summary

The final ended 2–0 in favour of Arsenal.

References

External links
 
 Report at WomensFACup.co.uk

Cup
Women's FA Cup finals
Arsenal W.F.C. matches
May 1999 sports events in the United Kingdom
1999 sports events in London